Transport Board may refer to:

 Auckland Transport Board Act
 Barbados Transport Board
 Bucharest Metropolitan Transport Board
 Ceylon Transport Board
 Commonwealth Land Transport Board, Australia
 Japan Transport Safety Board
 London Passenger Transport Board
 London Transport Board
 Sri Lanka Transport Board
 Transport Board (Royal Navy)
 Ulster Transport Authority, formerly the Northern Ireland Road Transport Board